Homalopoma boffii is a species of small sea snail with calcareous opercula, a marine gastropod mollusk in the family Colloniidae.

Description
The shell grows to  a height of 7 mm.

Distribution
This species occurs in the Atlantic Ocean off Southern Brazil at a depth between 182 m and 780 m

References

External links
 To Encyclopedia of Life
 To World Register of Marine Species
 

Colloniidae
Gastropods described in 1975